UFC 282: Błachowicz vs. Ankalaev  was a mixed martial arts event produced by the Ultimate Fighting Championship. It took place on December 10, 2022, at the T-Mobile Arena in Paradise, Nevada, part of the Las Vegas Metropolitan Area, United States.

Background
A UFC Light Heavyweight Championship rematch between then current champion Jiří Procházka (also former Rizin Light Heavyweight Champion) and former champion Glover Teixeira was originally expected to headline the event. The pair previously met at UFC 275 in June, with Procházka winning the back and forth fight (and championship) by submission in the fifth round. However, on November 23, Procházka pulled out due to a shoulder injury that will require surgery and at least six months of rehabilitation. He decided to vacate the title, and Teixeira subsequently refused a replacement fight against Magomed Ankalaev. Therefore, the co-main event bout between former champion Jan Błachowicz (also former KSW Light Heavyweight Champion) and Ankalaev was promoted to the main event status and arranged for the vacant championship.

A heavyweight bout between Jairzinho Rozenstruik and Chris Daukaus was originally scheduled for UFC Fight Night: Dern vs. Yan, but it was moved to this event for undisclosed reasons.

Promotional newcomer Bo Nickal was expected to face Jamie Pickett in a middleweight bout. However, it was announced in late October that Nickal withdrew due to injury and the bout was scrapped.

A light heavyweight bout between former title challenger Alexander Gustafsson and former interim title contender Ovince Saint Preux was expected to take place at the event. However, Gustafsson withdrew due to an undisclosed reason and was replaced by 2018 PFL heavyweight tournament winner Philipe Lins. In turn, Lins withdrew from the bout due to an undisclosed reason and was replaced by Antonio Trocoli. However, Trocoli withdrew due to visa issues. As a result, Saint Preux was pulled from the card as well due to the promotion being unable to find another replacement. 

A bantamweight bout between Cameron Saaiman and Ronnie Lawrence was expected to take place at the event. However, Lawrence withdrew for unknown reasons the week before the event and was replaced by promotional newcomer Steven Koslow.

A welterweight bout between former UFC Welterweight Champion Robbie Lawler and Santiago Ponzinibbio was expected to take place at the event. The pairing was previously scheduled to meet at UFC 245 in 2019 but Ponzinibbio withdrew due to a staph infection. However, the week of the event, the bout fell through again as Lawler was forced to withdraw due to an undisclosed injury. He was replaced by Alex Morono at a catchweight of 180 pounds.

A flyweight bout between Daniel da Silva and Vinicius Salvador was expected to take place at the event. However, after the official weigh-ins, in which da Silva weighed in at 129 pounds, three pounds over the flyweight non-title fight limit, it was announced he had been pulled from the card due to an undisclosed medical issue and the bout was scrapped.

Results

Bonus awards 
The following fighters received $50,000 bonuses.

Fight of the Night: Dricus du Plessis vs. Darren Till
Performance of the Night: Santiago Ponzinibbio, Ilia Topuria, Raul Rosas Jr., Jairzinho Rozenstruik, Edmen Shahbazyan, Chris Curtis, Billy Quarantillo, T.J. Brown, and Cameron Saaiman

With eleven post-fight bonuses, this was the record for most bonuses given in a single UFC event.

See also 

 List of UFC events
 List of current UFC fighters
 2022 in UFC

References 

Ultimate Fighting Championship events
Events in Paradise, Nevada
2022 in mixed martial arts
Mixed martial arts in Las Vegas
Sports competitions in Las Vegas
December 2022 sports events in the United States